"Friday", also known as "Friday (Dopamine Re-Edit)", is a song recorded by English DJ and producer Riton and Scottish house music project Nightcrawlers featuring internet personalities Mufasa & Hypeman with uncredited vocals by Samantha Harper. It was released on 15 January 2021 through Ministry of Sound. The song heavily samples the MK remix of Nightcrawlers' "Push the Feeling On" (1992). It reached number one in Flanders and Poland, and the top 10 in Germany, Italy, Ireland, Lithuania, the Netherlands, the United Kingdom and Wallonia, as well as the top 20 in Australia and in Canada.

Background
In early 2020, Mufasa & Hypeman started gaining viral success through dance clips and meme videos. English DJ Riton and producers The Invisible Men became aware of the duo through their viral videos on YouTube. About the collaboration, he revealed, "They are the only people who should be allowed to use social media in 2021! They got a lot of people through 2020, and so it's only right to make a song out of it and do it all again in 2021".

Video
The official video for "Friday" features Mufasa waking the cameraman up, then joining Hypeman and some friends to dance on a boat, in a house, near a car, and in a desert. The video features some of Mufasa's viral dancing, as well as Riton DJing and John Reid of Nightcrawlers appearing to "sing" his sampled vocals from the original "Push the Feeling On" remix.

Charts

Weekly charts

Year-end charts

Certifications

References

2021 singles
2021 songs
Ministry of Sound singles
Nightcrawlers (band) songs
Number-one singles in Poland
Riton (musician) songs
Song recordings produced by the Invisible Men
Ultratop 50 Singles (Flanders) number-one singles